Agios Andronikos is the name of two villages in the Famagusta District of Cyprus:

 Agios Andronikos, a village near Gialousa
 Agios Andronikos (Topçuköy), a village near Trikomo